Carl Sweezy (1881–1953) was a Southern Arapaho painter from Oklahoma. He painted individual portraits, but was best known for his portrayals of ceremonies and dances.

Background
Carl Sweezy was born in 1881 near the Darlington Agency on the Cheyenne and Arapaho Indian Reservation in Indian Territory. His Arapaho name was Wattan, meaning "Black." Sweezy's father was Hinan Ba Seth, meaning "Big Man." His tribe still hunted buffalo when he was a child.

Sweezy's mother died early, so he lived full-time at the Mennonite Mission School at Darlington Agency. He later attended the Mennonite Boarding School of Halstead, Kansas, Carlisle Indian Boarding School in Pennsylvania, and Chilocco Indian Agricultural School, north of Ponca City, Oklahoma. For a season Sweezy was a professional baseball player, and later he worked as a tribal policeman. Although he never received formal art training, he loved drawing and painting from an early age. An agency employee encouraged him with a gift of watercolor paints.

Artwork
Around 1895, when Sweezy was 14 years old, ethnographer James Mooney commissioned Sweezy to paint images of traditional Arapaho life. Later, Sweezy also worked with anthropologist George Dorsey. Sweezy continued to be a prolific painter, expanding his media and materials into the mid-20th century. By the 1920s Sweezy was a full-time painter.

Sweezy worked in watercolors on paper and oil on canvas, as well as house paint on board. He was one of Cheyenne artist Dick West's first artistic mentors. Although he painted individual portraits, he is known for his portrayals of ceremonies and dances, sometimes with over a dozen individual figures, with implied action and narrative. Sweezy developed a technique, employed by later Southern Plains artists, of painting an active Native American Church meeting by rolling up the tipi flaps to reveal the participants inside.

Public collections
Sweezy's work can be found in the following public art collections:

Cleveland Museum of Natural History
Fred Jones Jr. Museum of Art
The George Gustav Heye Center
Gilcrease Museum
Heard Museum
Indian Arts and Crafts Board, US Department of the Interior
Oklahoma History Center
National Museum of the American Indian, Washington DC
Oklahoma Museum of Natural History
Philbrook Museum of Art
Southwest Museum, Los Angeles
University of Oklahoma, Library

Death
Carl Sweezy died on May 28, 1953 in Lawton, Oklahoma.

Quotes
The corn road, we found, was different from the buffalo road in more ways than anyone, white or Indian, had realized, and the old people could not learn it in a hurry. —Carl Sweezy

With war horses running, feathers and banners flying on the wind from spears and lances, shields and quivers shining at men's sides and shoulders, and women singing war songs for their men, I think a war party setting out, or coming in victorious, must have been one of the splendid things in life to see. If I had to miss that, I have had the next best thing: I have seen old warriors wearing their fine trappings, and I have heard them tell their stories... –Carl Sweezy, 1950

Notes

References
Lester, Patrick D. The Biographical Directory of Native American Painters. Norman and London: The Oklahoma University Press, 1995. .
Morand, Ann, Kevin Smith, Daniel C. Swan, and Sarah Erwin. Treasures of Gilcrease: Selections from the Permanent Collection. Tulsa, OK: Gilcrease Museum, 2003. .
Swan, Daniel C.Peyote Religious Art: Symbols of Faith and Belief. Jackson: University of Mississippi Press, 1999. 
Wyckoff, Lydia L., ed. Visions and voices : Native American painting from the Philbrook Museum of Art. Tulsa, OK: Philbrook Museum of Art, 1996. .

External links
Carl Sweezy artwork in the Smithsonian Institution's collection

Arapaho people
Native American painters
Native American Church
Painters from Oklahoma
People from Canadian County, Oklahoma
1881 births
1953 deaths
20th-century American painters
American male painters
Carlisle Indian Industrial School alumni
Native American male artists
20th-century American male artists